Hort., in the taxonomy of plants, is an abbreviation used to indicate a name that saw significant use in the horticultural literature (usually of the 19th century and earlier), but was never properly published.

Origins and usage
"Hort.," short for hortulanus, was proposed in order that non-wild, cultivated plants known and described in agriculture or gardening circles can be examined by taxonomists to determine if the plants can be established as species and published.
The proposal was made at the 1928 "International Congress of Horticulture of Vienna" by citrus scholar Tyozaburo Tanaka.

For example, for the clementine, the following binomial name was adopted by Tanaka:

Citrus clementina hort. ex Tanaka

Citations

Plant taxonomy
Latin words and phrases